Dorrigo, a small town on the Waterfall Way, is located on the Northern Tablelands, in northern New South Wales, Australia. The town is part of Bellingen local government area.

The town is situated on the Dorrigo Plateau near the New England Escarpment, which is part of the Great Dividing Range. At the 2016 census, Dorrigo had a population of 1,042 people.

History
The area now known as Dorrigo lies on the traditional land of the Gumbainggir people.

European settlement of the area followed on from the early timber cutters in the 1860s. The first official European in the district was Land Commissioner Oakes who sighted the mouth of the Bellinger River.

Dorrigo is derived from the Aboriginal word, dondorrigo or Dandarrga, meaning "stringy-bark". For many decades it was believed that explorer and settler Major Edward Parke named the region after a Spanish General named Don Dorrigo with whom Parke fought in the Peninsula War.

By 1841, timber cutters had entered the Bellinger River searching for red cedar (Toona australis). They set up camps and moved from one stand of trees to the next.

Richard Craig, an escaped convict from the Moreton Bay Penal Settlement, was the first European to reach the Dorrigo Plateau, following the traditional indigenous route to Armidale from the Grafton area. Using his skills as a horseman, Craig travelled along the western side of the Nymboida River. Craig's track became a road, now roughly following the same path as the present Grafton to Armidale Road and travelling through the present day villages of Nymboida, Billy's Creek, Dundurrabin, Tyringham and Ebor. Timbergetters followed Craig through the sub tropical rainforest and many sawmills grew due to demand for timber, initially the highly prized Australian Red Cedar (Toona australis).

Today, the main access road traversing the plateau from east to west is the Waterfall Way. It was not until the 1860s that permanent settlement occurred in the district. The dairy industry became a mainstay of the Dorrigo Plateau and today tourism is becoming more important. On 23 December 1924, the Glenreagh to Dorrigo railway opened. Due to flood damage, the line closed on 28 October 1972.

On 31 October 2005, sixty-eight dairy cows, all in full milk, died on a farm at Fernbrook on the Waterfall Way near Dorrigo after being struck by lightning. Three others were paralysed for several hours but they later made a full recovery. The cows were sheltering under a tree when it was struck by lightning and the electricity spread onto the surrounding soil killing the animals.

Population
In the 2016 Census, there were 1,042 people in Dorrigo. 85.2% of people were born in Australia and 93.4% of people only spoke English at home. The most common responses for religion were No Religion 32.7%, Anglican 27.4% and Catholic 12.9%.

Attractions
Dorrigo is home to the planned Dorrigo Steam Railway and Museum which is not yet open to the public. It houses the largest collection of railway vehicles and memorabilia from the various Government and private railways of New South Wales. It is one of the most comprehensive railway collections in the world, with items in the collection ranging from 1855 to the present day. The museum is not open to the public however the larger items such as steam engines and carriages can be viewed from outside the property. The nearby World Heritage listed Dorrigo National Park and New England National Park cater for persons interested in natural sights. A full listing of attractions are available here

Dangar Falls
The falls are small but picturesque, and are a popular photographic subject. For a short time after rain they are quite spectacular. There is an attractive picnic spot which offers excellent views. It is possible to climb down the banks and walk along the river below the water falls.

For more information about Dangars Falls see the articles on Dangarsleigh and on the Oxley Wild Rivers National Park.

Dorrigo monument

The Dorrigo War Memorial is a stone column in the centre of the intersection of Waterfall Way and Hickory Street. It is a brown stone obelisk with the names of First World War servicemen and women carved into the stone in gold letters. The names of Servicemen and women and dedications from the Second World War are carved on plaques attached to the original stonework. A white stone statue of a soldier stands atop the memorial, facing east. The monument is surrounded by a small garden with ground lighting to illuminate the memorial at night.

Heritage Hotel Dorrigo

The large building on the south west corner of Dorrigo's main intersection (Waterfall Way and Hickory Street) was constructed in 1925. It is of solid brick construction and is typical of country town hotels of the 1920s. Its small hotel rooms have been combined in pairs to provide modern ensuite accommodation that is air conditioned. Its Fernery Bistro provides gourmet meals as well as economical hotel staples.

Schools
 Dorrigo Public School
 Mt Saint John's Primary School
 Dorrigo High School

Media
A local newspaper, the Don Dorrigo Gazette, was first published in 1910. It is believed to be the last newspaper in Australia printed using hot metal typesetting.

Climate 
Dorrigo has a oceanic climate or highland subtropical climate (Köppen: Cfb). The average annual rainfall is almost 2,000mm, making Dorrigo one of the wettest towns in New South Wales.

Significant weather events

On 19 October 1913, a severe hailstorm struck Dorrigo, where hail fell for an hour, with hail banked up in many places. The storm caused hundreds of pounds of damage. On 6 August 1923, the first known snowfall occurred at Dorrigo.

On 24 June 1950,  of rain was recorded in the 24 hours to 9 am at Dorrigo Post Office. In the following 24 hours, to 9 am on 25 June 1950, a further  of rain was recorded at the same site.
This is also the highest daily rainfall total for anywhere in New South Wales. This was recorded at Myrtle Street in Dorrigo. Another Bureau of Meteorology site located at Dorrigo Post Office recorded  of rain within the same 24-hour period to 9 am on 21 February 1954. These heavy rainfall totals were associated with a tropical cyclone which had crossed the coast at Coolangatta and Tweed Heads late on 20 February 1954.

Gallery

References

External links

 Destination NSW – Dorrigo
 VISITNSW.com – Dorrigo
 Dorrigo 360 Aerial Panorama
 Destination Dorrigo

Towns in New South Wales
Mid North Coast
Northern Tablelands
Australian soldier settlements
Bellingen Shire